The Belen Harvey House, at 104 N. 1st St. in Belen, New Mexico, also known as the Harvey House Museum, was built in 1901 as the Santa Fe Hotel.  It was extensively remodeled in 1910 into a Harvey House, one of a number of restaurants at railway stations in the U.S. southwest. The architect for the remodel was Myron Church and the architectural style is Mission/Spanish Revival. The building is currently used as a museum. It was listed on the National Register of Historic Places in 1983.

References

External links
https://www.harveyhousemuseum.org/

Belen Harvey House
Museums in Valencia County, New Mexico
National Register of Historic Places in Valencia County, New Mexico
Mission Revival architecture in New Mexico
Houses completed in 1901
History museums in New Mexico